Primal Fear is a 1993 American thriller novel by William Diehl about Aaron Stampler, an altar boy accused of murder, and Martin Vail, the attorney defending him.

It was adapted into a film of the same name in 1996, starring Richard Gere and Edward Norton.

The characters of Stampler and Vail appear in two additional novels by author Diehl, Show of Evil and Reign in Hell.

References

1993 American novels
American thriller novels
Legal thriller novels
English-language novels
American novels adapted into films
Villard (imprint) books